Fence is a village in the civil parish of Old Laund Booth, Pendle, Lancashire, England, close to the towns of Nelson and Burnley. It lies alongside the A6068 road, known locally as the Padiham bypass. The parish (which includes the adjoining village of Wheatley Lane) has a population of 1,586.

Fence is a small village along 'Wheatley Lane Road', It abuts the sister village of Wheatley Lane. Because of this, Fence and Wheatley Lane are often referred to together as 'Fence'. The present village now terminates to the west past St Anne's  church, where the new bypass cuts the line of the old road.

Fence was in the Hundred of Blackburn. Up until late medieval times, it lay in the Forest of Pendle, the hunting preserve of the King. The name of the village, is derived from the fact that an enclosure was erected in the area, within which the King's deer were kept. This became known as the "Fence", and the community that built up around it over time took the name. 

In 1507, Henry VII "surrendered [the parcel called the Fence] to the use of the tenants of Higham, West Close and Goldshaw Booth, to be held by them and their heirs for ever." 

The first mention of Fence, is in a document of 1402, as 'Fens in Penhill'. Being near Pendle Hill, Fence has a long shared history with other Pendleside villages, and the Pendle Witches, some old local surnames are shared with the historical witches; for example, the Nutter  family name.

Cuckstool Lane, which runs south from the War Memorial was the original site  of the village ducking stool, where (the story has it) suspected witches were immersed in a pond, or more likely 'cuckolds', those suspected of adultery. Hoarstones, which lies inside Fence, was the site of an ancient stone circle, and also the starting point for the 1633 witchcraft trials (see the entry under Wheatley Lane). 

The older properties on the village consist largely of small stone built cottages, with later housing developments from the 1960s onwards. There is unbroken countryside  with fine walking country to the North to Pendle Hill and surrounding areas.

The villages are served by St Anne's church (CoE), two Methodist chapels and a primary school.

See also

Listed buildings in Old Laund Booth

References

External links

 BBC Sunday Stroll in Higham & Fence

 
Towns and villages in the Borough of Pendle